Tohir Malodustov (born 12 September 2000) is a Tajikistani professional football player who currently plays for Khujand.

Career

International
Malodustov made his senior team debut on 10 July 2019 against North Korea.

Career statistics

International

Statistics accurate as of match played 1 February 2021

References

2000 births
Living people
Tajikistani footballers
Tajikistan international footballers
Association football forwards